Ngô Văn Dụ (born 21 December 1947 in Vĩnh Phúc Province) is a Vietnamese politician who served as the Chairman of the Central Commission for Inspection of the Communist Party of Vietnam from 2011 to 2016. Ngô Văn Dụ was a member of the 11th Politburo, in which he was ranked 12th.

References

Deputy Prime Ministers of Vietnam
1953 births
Living people
Members of the 11th Politburo of the Communist Party of Vietnam
Members of the 10th Secretariat of the Communist Party of Vietnam
Members of the 11th Secretariat of the Communist Party of Vietnam
Members of the 9th Central Committee of the Communist Party of Vietnam
Members of the 10th Central Committee of the Communist Party of Vietnam
Members of the 11th Central Committee of the Communist Party of Vietnam
People from Vĩnh Phúc province